Katie Sherwood (née Daley; 5 January 1986) is a former footballer who played for the Welsh national women's team. Sherwood plays as a central midfielder and has a half-century of caps for Wales. She is from Llanrumney.

Club career
Sherwood began her career at Cardiff City and won club Player of the Year, joint–Most Improved Player and the club Achievement Award for season 2001–02. The following season Sherwood helped Cardiff collect the Welsh Women's Cup and subsequently represented the club in the UEFA Women's Cup.

She won a scholarship to Middle Tennessee State University in 2005 and played varsity soccer for two seasons.

She returned to Cardiff City, but they were relegated in 2008. Sherwood then joined the Welsh contingent at Bristol Academy. In February 2012 she signed for Bristol's WSL rivals Chelsea Ladies and began using the surname Sherwood instead of Daley.

In November 2013 Sherwood signed for Yeovil Town, who were preparing to enter the new second tier of the FA WSL.

International career
Sherwood captained Wales at youth level and eventually scored three goals in 24 games for the U19 team. In February 2002 she was called into the senior squad for the Algarve Cup. She made her senior debut, aged 16, in a 4–0 defeat to Canada in Lagoa, Portugal on 3 March 2002.

Personal life
Sherwood is qualified as a teacher. She is married to Jamie Sherwood, who became manager of Cardiff City Ladies in summer 2012. They have one son.

References

External links
Katie Daley at UEFA
Katie Daley at FAW
Katie Daley at Middle Tennessee Blue Raiders

1986 births
Living people
Footballers from Cardiff
Cardiff City Ladies F.C. players
Chelsea F.C. Women players
Bristol Academy W.F.C. players
Yeovil Town L.F.C. players
Wales women's international footballers
FA Women's National League players
Women's Super League players
Middle Tennessee Blue Raiders women's soccer players
Welsh women's footballers
Women's association football midfielders